Azeez Oseni (born 16 October 2002) is a Nigerian professional footballer who plays as a attacking midfielder for FC Spartak Trnava.

Club career

FC Spartak Trnava
Oseni signed his first professional contract with FC Spartak Trnava in May 2022, coming from Nigerian club 36 Lion FC. Both sides agreed on one-year loan with option to buy.

Oseni made his professional Fortuna Liga debut for Spartak Trnava against MFK Skalica on 27 August 2022. He came in the 77th minute of the match.

References

External links
 FC Spartak Trnava official club profile 
 
 Fortuna Liga Profile 
 Futbalnet Profile 

2002 births
Living people
Nigerian footballers
Nigerian expatriate footballers
Association football midfielders
FC Spartak Trnava players
Slovak Super Liga players
3. Liga (Slovakia) players
Expatriate footballers in Slovakia
Nigerian expatriate sportspeople in Slovakia
Sportspeople from Lagos